The University of Missouri Research Reactor Center (MURR) is home to a tank-type nuclear research reactor that serves the University of Missouri in Columbia, United States. , the MURR is the highest power university research reactor in the U.S. at 10 megawatt thermal output. The fuel is highly enriched uranium.

History and overview
In 1959, University President Elmer Ellis proposed a research reactor, understanding that the many fields of research to benefit from nuclear science "are a part of the University of Missouri's educational responsibilities to our youth and to all our citizens". The MURR began operation October 13, 1966, about one mile (1.6 km) southwest of the university's main campus and the city's main business district.  The reactor building was designed by Cornelius L.T. Gabler and Associates of Detroit, Michigan. The architectural style is mid-century modern.  The supplier of construction services was General Electric. In 1970, MURR scientist Dr. George Leddicotte gave the first courtroom testimony on murder trial evidence using neutron activation analysis. Four years later MURR began operating at 10 MW, making it the highest powered U.S. university reactor. Ir-192 was first produced at MURR for fighting breast cancer in 1976. The first small angle neutron scattering (SANS) spectrometer in the U.S. was installed in 1980. In 1986 the first experiments were performed that led to developing Quadramet and TheraSphere, which were later approved by the U.S. Food and Drug Administration (FDA) for helping fight against bone and liver cancer respectively.

Since 2000, systematic upgrades, renovation, and renewal to MURR facilities and instrumentation in preparation for the next 20 years of licensed operation have taken place. In 2002, a  building addition opened the way for expansion into cGMP scaleup of isotopes. Work began in 2006 on a  addition to house laboratories, classrooms and offices to advance interdisciplinary research, education and treatment of patients. It is estimated that as of March 2012, MURR supports approximately 400 faculty members and 150 graduate students representing more than 180 departments from more than 100 international universities, as well as around 40 federal and industrial laboratories each year. A cyclotron that will supply mid-Missouri with isotopes for PET imaging and support additional research, development, and clinical trials has been installed.

In 2016, MURR was awarded the Nuclear Historic Landmark Award from the American Nuclear Society.

Licensing
Some important reactor events are summarized here.

MURR began the process to renew its operating license in 2006, and responded to requests for additional information in 2009 and 2010.  On January 4, 2017, MURR was granted a renewal of the facility operating license, which allows for operation until 2037.

Research
The MURR contributes to research in boron neutron capture therapy, neutron scattering and neutron interferometry, neutron transmutation doping of semiconductor materials, use of radioisotopes for imaging and treatment of cancer, epidemiology, and archaeology, along with many others.

Archaeometry Laboratory
The Archaeometry Laboratory at MURR has been funded by National Science Foundation (NSF) since 1988. The neutron activation capabilities are used to characterize over 30 major, minor, and trace elements in archaeological and geological materials.  In addition to neutron activation, the laboratory maintains and operates several X-ray fluorescence spectrometers, multiple ICP-mass spectrometers, and a multi-collector ICP-MS for isotope-ratio mass spectrometry.  The laboratory is one of only a handful of facilities in the world to have access to all of these analytical methods.

Data generated by the laboratory are typically used by archaeologists to study issues relating to provenance (geological source) that facilitate understanding of trade and exchange in prehistory.  The laboratory also handles analyses of geological materials in support of geology, soil science, and other environmental sciences.

Neutron scattering

The neutron scattering program at MURR has a long and productive history.  On the one hand, many prominent scientists have graduated from this program and benefited from the in depth, hands on experience afforded by MURR's unique combination of high neutron flux and proximity to a flagship campus (the University of Missouri).  On the other hand, cutting edge research continues on the four active neutron scattering instruments of MURR's beamport floor: Triax (a triple-axis spectrometer), NR/GANS (a neutron reflectometer with spin-polarized capability), 2X-C (a multi-detector diffractometer), and PSD (a high-resolution diffractometer with position sensitive detectors). Furthermore, the landmark neutron interferometry experiments performed here have played an important role in opening the field of experimental quantum mechanics.

References

External links
 
 ABC's Radioactive Roadtrip Security Review of the Research Reactor Center
  MURR's Neutron Scattering program
  MURR Archaeometry Laboratory

Nuclear reactors
Nuclear research reactors
University of Missouri campus
Science and technology in Missouri